Laurie Park is a locality located within the Naracoorte Lucindale Council in the Limestone Coast region of South Australia.

Boundaries for the locality were created on 12 April 2001.  Its boundaries include the southern part of the site of the ceased Government Town of Jessie.

Laurie Park is located within the federal division of Barker, the state electoral district of MacKillop and the local government area of the Naracoorte Lucindale Council.

References
Notes

Citations

Limestone Coast